Hastings High School (HHS) is a comprehensive public high school and the only high school of the Hastings-on-Hudson Union Free School District in Westchester County, New York. The principal is Louis Adipietro.

History 
The class of 1908 was the first graduating class of Hastings High School. In 1949, the school adopted the coat of arms of Hastings, England.

Rankings
Hastings High School was ranked 162nd on Newsweek's ranking of the top US high schools.

Awards 
Hastings High School was a recipient of the U.S. Department of Education's National Blue Ribbon Award for excellence for 2001–2002 and for 2016–2017.

Theater 
Hastings High School received a $10,000 grant from a division of the National Broadcasting Corporation to put on a production of Hairspray.

Theater Arts was offered in 2019.

Music 
Courses in music theory (both AP-level and non-AP level), choir, and recording technology were offered at Hastings High School in 2019.

Extracurricular offerings include a band, jazz band, choir, "madrigal" advanced choir, steel pan ensemble, and orchestra.

Athletics

Hastings is a member of the New York State Public High School Athletic Association. The Hastings Athletics Department has been recognized by the Journal News as recipients of the NHSCSA Sportsmen Medallion for their outstanding efforts in both Crowd Attendance and Spirit. The Student Section, also known as the "Cochran Crazies," has been awarded the TFS Scholar Creative Minds Award recognized by the Section 1 Athletic Committee in 2006.

Hastings High School's curling team won both the County and Section titles during the '05 and '06 Campaigns.

Hastings 2015 Boys Varsity Soccer team made a New York State Final Four run after winning both the league and the section.

Hastings 2016 Boys Varsity Soccer returned to the Final Four and the team won the New York State Class B Championship after winning their league, section, and region.  This was Hastings' first state championship win in any sport.

The Buzzer 
Hastings High School's newspaper, The Buzzer, is one of the most successful clubs at the school. It has been represented by its Editorial Staffs at the Columbia Scholastic Press Association's Annual Conference at Columbia University, the Young Author's Conference of 2007, and "Journalism That Matters: The DC Sessions" at The George Washington University.

Clubs

 Academic Challenge (AcChal)
 Amnesty International
 Animal Appreciation Club 
 Art Club
 The Buzzer
 Book Club
 Hastings Yellow Jackets Booster Club
 Chess Club
 Classics Club
 Computer Science Team
 Crossing Borders
 Culinary Club
 Debate Club
 Environmental Club
 Feminism Club
 Film Club
 Fitness Club

 Future Voters of America
 Garden Club
 Gender Sexuality Alliance (G.S.A.)
 Habitat for Humanity
 Investing Club
 M.O.O.K. Club
 Model Rocketry Club
 Open Mic Night
 Outing Club
 Photo Club
 Project Share
 Railroad Club
 S.A.D.D. Club
 Student Union (S.U.)
 Super Smash Bros. (Smash) Club
 TV Studio Club
 Ultimate Frisbee Club
 WestMUNC
 Yearbook Club

Notable alumni 
 Stephen Collins, actor
 Libby Copeland, reporter for the Washington Post
 Ricki Lake (born 1968), actress, television presenter and producer
 Ali Marpet (born 1993), American football center for the Tampa Bay Buccaneers of the National Football League (NFL)
 Robert Meeropol (born 1947), son of Ethel and Julius Rosenberg
 Dave Rice (born c. 1940), college football coach
 Benh Zeitlin (born 1982), filmmaker, composer, and animator
 John Dehner (born 1915), stage, radio, film, and television actor

Race Relations and Demographics 
The school's lack of ethnic diversity has been commented on.

References

External links 

"HHS Home Page"
"HHS Newspaper"

Public high schools in Westchester County, New York